Belgirate is a comune (municipality) in the Province of Verbano-Cusio-Ossola in the Italian region of Piedmont, located about  northeast of Turin and about  south of Verbania.

Belgirate borders the following municipalities: Besozzo, Brebbia, Ispra, Leggiuno, Lesa, Monvalle, Stresa.

The small Romanesque church of St. Mary dates to the 11th century and is preceded by a 16th-century portico with some frescoes of Bernardino Luini school.

References

External links
Official Tourism Gateway Lake Maggiore Official Tourism Gateway

Cities and towns in Piedmont